The Centenario is a Mexican gold bullion coin first minted in 1921 to commemorate the 100th anniversary of Mexico's independence from Spain. The coin is not intended to be used as currency; the face value of 50 pesos is for legal purposes only, and does not reflect the actual value of the gold content.

The obverse of the Centenario contains the image of Winged Victory (El Ángel, El Ángel de la Independencia: "The Angel of Independence"), with a laurel wreath in her right hand and broken chains in her left. Two famous Mexican volcanoes, Popocatepetl and Iztaccíhuatl, rise in the background. The 1821 on the lower left commemorates the year of Mexico's independence. The date on the right indicates year of mintage, with the 1921 and 1931 (the last year of the original series) mintages being particularly valuable.  Production restarted in 1943 due to the demand for gold coins, and coins minted between 1949 and 1972 are usually marked "1947".

This coin was designed by Emilio del Moral.

The reverse depicts the coat of arms of Mexico, which shows the Golden eagle perched on a cactus with a serpent (rattlesnake) in its beak.

The Centenario weighs 41.67 grams and contains 37.5 grams (1.20565 troy ounces) of gold in an alloy of 90% gold and 10% copper (crown gold), and is 37 mm in diameter. The 1943 mintage is somewhat special because of the double "37.5 Gr Oro Puro" markings, leaving out the "50 pesos" legend, and has the same diameter : 37 mm.

The original Centenario design was used in the later Libertad Series of gold and silver bullion coins.

Centenario Minting History. 

 *With date of 1947

External links
Centenario Family - Banco de México (in English)

Bullion coins of Mexico
Gold bullion coins